Nakia is a unisex given name of multiple origins and meanings. In Greece the name means "unconquered".  In Arabic "pure", and Egyptian "Pure and faithful". Not many baby naming sites point out the other origins of the name, as they also neglect to inform of the other pronunciations the name has.

The pronunciations include, but are not limited to, Nah-k-ee-ah (the commonly seen), Nay-k-ee-ah, Ni-k-ee-yah, Nuh-k-EYE-yuh/Nah-k-EYE-ah, Nek~ean, etc.

People named Nakia

Males
 Nakia, American musician, singer-songwriter and actor, born Nakia Reynoso
 Nakia Codie, American football player
 Nakia Coleman, American rapper better known as Kia Shine
 Nakia Griffin-Stewart, American football player
 Nakia Jenkins, American former football player

Females
 Nakia Burrise, African American actress and director 
 Nakia Sanford, American basketball center
 Nakia D. Johnson, American author

Fictional characters
 Deputy Nakia Parker, portrayed by Robert Forster in the 1974 television series Nakia
 Nakia, the name of Malice, an enemy of Black Panther in Marvel Comics
 Naia Cabral, character from the Marvel Comics
 Queen Nakia, the name of the villain in the Red River (manga) by Chie Shinohara

References

Arabic unisex given names
Unisex given names
Given names